Thad Jones/Mel Lewis Orchestra With Rhoda Scott (a.k.a. Rhoda Scott in New York with the Thad Jones/Mel Lewis Orchestra) is a 1976 big band jazz album recorded by jazz organist Rhoda Scott with the Thad Jones/Mel Lewis Jazz Orchestra and released on the Barclay (France) record label.

Track listing
LP side A:
 "Mach 2" – 4:30
 "Tanikka" – 4:29
 "Rhoda Map" (Thad Jones) – 5:00
 "R And R" – 4:14
LP side B:
 "Charlotte's Waltz" – 4:30
 "Walkin About" – 5:07
 "Take A Ladder" – 7:22
Bonus tracks on later CD release:
 "La La Solitude" (Pierre Delanoë) – 4:22
 "Quand Je Monte Chez Toi" (Jean Broussolle) – 3:58
All songs composed by Rhoda Scott except as noted

Personnel
 Rhoda Scott – Hammond organ
 Thad Jones – flugelhorn (except track A1)
 Mel Lewis – drums
 Harold Danko – piano
 Bob Bowman – bass
 Jerry Dodgion – alto saxophone, flute
 Larry Schneider – tenor saxophone, clarinet
 Greg Herbert – tenor saxophone, flute, clarinet
 Ed Xiques – alto saxophone, flute
 Pepper Adams – baritone saxophone
 Al Porcino – trumpet
 Cecil Bridgewater – trumpet
 Earl Gardner – trumpet
 Lynn Nicholson – trumpet
 Billy Campbell – trombone
 Clifford Adams – trombone
 Earl McIntyre – trombone
 John Mosca – trombone

References and external links
 Barclay 90068
 Barclay 813590-2
 Universal Jazz 0 602498 112069
 discogs.com
 RhodaScott.com
 Classics and Jazz.co.uk

The Thad Jones/Mel Lewis Orchestra albums
1976 albums